Ectropis obliqua is a species of moth in the family Geometridae first described by Prout in 1915.

Description 
The larva body surface is smooth, with only six abdominal and hip section on foot, trunk when a flexor stretching, commonly known as back arched bug or gauge.

Infestation of tea plants 
E. obliqua is one of the most destructive pest insects on tea plants throughout growing areas of this crop in southern China, causing widespread damage in Zhejiang, Jiangsu, and Anhui provinces. Larvae feed solely on shoots and leaves of C. sinensis and occur in six or seven overlapping generations throughout the growing season of tea plants.

Infestations of tea plants may be treated by removing the pupa stage of the E. obliqua life cycle, through predation by chickens, manual removal of larvae, chemical treatments, or biological control (e.g. with tea looper karyotype virus).

Associated viruses 
The Ectropis obliqua picorna-like virus (EoPV) has been isolated from E. obliqua larvae.

References

Insects of Asia
Boarmiini